Microporella is a genus of bryozoans belonging to the family Microporellidae.

The genus has cosmopolitan distribution.

Species:

Microporella acicularis 
Microporella agonistes 
Microporella alaskana 
Microporella ampla 
Microporella antarctica 
Microporella antiborealis 
Microporella appendiculata 
Microporella arctica 
Microporella areolata 
Microporella areolata 
Microporella aspera 
Microporella barrandei 
Microporella berningi 
Microporella bicollaris 
Microporella bicristata 
Microporella bifoliata 
Microporella borealis 
Microporella browni 
Microporella cailleti 
Microporella californica 
Microporella candeana 
Microporella catalinensis 
Microporella chubutiana 
Microporella ciliata 
Microporella clypeiformis 
Microporella collaroides 
Microporella coronata 
Microporella coronula 
Microporella crenilabris 
Microporella cribellata 
Microporella cribosa
Microporella cribrosa 
Microporella crustula 
Microporella cucullata 
Microporella curta 
Microporella decussata 
Microporella dentilingua 
Microporella diademata 
Microporella dimidiata 
Microporella discors 
Microporella divaricata 
Microporella donovani 
Microporella echinata 
Microporella elegans 
Microporella epihalimeda 
Microporella eustomata 
Microporella fallax 
Microporella ferrea 
Microporella fimbriata 
Microporella fissurifera 
Microporella flabelligera 
Microporella formosa 
Microporella franklini 
Microporella funbio 
Microporella galapagensis 
Microporella gappai 
Microporella genisii 
Microporella germana 
Microporella gibbera 
Microporella gibbosula 
Microporella goreaui 
Microporella harmeri 
Microporella hastigera 
Microporella hastingsae 
Microporella hawaiiensis 
Microporella heermannii 
Microporella hexagona 
Microporella huanghaiensis 
Microporella hyadesi 
Microporella ichnusae 
Microporella impressa 
Microporella inamoena 
Microporella incrustans 
Microporella inermis 
Microporella inflata 
Microporella infundibulipora 
Microporella intermedia 
Microporella joannae 
Microporella ketchikanensis 
Microporella klugei 
Microporella laticella 
Microporella leopolitana 
Microporella lepralioides 
Microporella lepueana 
Microporella lezinyosi 
Microporella lineata 
Microporella lingulata 
Microporella luellae 
Microporella lunifera 
Microporella madiba 
Microporella maldiviensis 
Microporella mandibulata 
Microporella marginata 
Microporella marsupiata 
Microporella mayensis 
Microporella mazatlanica 
Microporella micropora 
Microporella modesta 
Microporella monilifera 
Microporella neocribroides 
Microporella nidulata 
Microporella noaillanensis 
Microporella normani 
Microporella ordo 
Microporella ordoides 
Microporella orientalis 
Microporella pachyspina 
Microporella papulifera 
Microporella paterifera 
Microporella pectinata 
Microporella personata 
Microporella peschongi 
Microporella pirikaensis 
Microporella plana 
Microporella planata 
Microporella pocilliformis 
Microporella pontifica 
Microporella praecilata 
Microporella praeciliata 
Microporella protea 
Microporella proxima 
Microporella pulchra 
Microporella pulchra 
Microporella pyriformis 
Microporella regularis 
Microporella rhodanica 
Microporella rogickae 
Microporella rusti 
Microporella sanmiguelensis 
Microporella santabarbarensis 
Microporella sarasotaensis 
Microporella saucatsensis 
Microporella serrata 
Microporella setiformis 
Microporella soulieri 
Microporella speciosa 
Microporella speculum 
Microporella spicata 
Microporella stellata 
Microporella stenoporta 
Microporella svalbardensis 
Microporella tamiamiensis 
Microporella tanyae 
Microporella tetrastoma 
Microporella tonkinensis 
Microporella tractabilis 
Microporella trigonellata 
Microporella tubulifera 
Microporella typica 
Microporella umbonata 
Microporella umboniformis 
Microporella umbonula 
Microporella umbraeula
Microporella unca 
Microporella utriculus 
Microporella vacuatus 
Microporella ventricosa 
Microporella vibraculifera 
Microporella waghotensis 
Microporella wrigleyi

References

Bryozoan genera